Eerie Materials was an independent record label started in the early 1990s, first based in Richmond, Virginia, and later in San Francisco, California.

History 
Before the label began, in the late 1980s, brother and sister Troy Fiscella and Tristana Fiscella, along with their friends Mark, Frances, and Scott H., formed the band Eeyore Power Tool (which went by various names depending on the release, examples are "Eeyore Fiend Magnet", "Eeyore Prayer Tool", and "Eeyore Crypt Orchid", among many others). They became an important influence in the cassette culture of the time, and formed several other interesting musical projects, including Cave Clown Microwave (which included contributions from the people of Wheelchair Full of Old Men, Thought Balloon Tapes, Nauscopy, and many others); and Kingdom Scum, who later had LPs and CDs not only on Eerie Materials but on Staalplaat and Turn of the Century as well.

Releases by Eeyore Power Tool included a split 7-inch with Sockeye, another one with Caroliner, and an LP with hand-decorated covers. There was also a remarkable video release, "Eeyore Grumpy Ghoul: Scenese From the 1902 Virgin Scary Tour" (where "1902" was their way of saying "1992").

Other bands on the Eerie roster included Negativland, Evolution Control Committee, Faxed Head, Brown Cuts Neighbors, and Hemorrhoy Rogers and the Rrhoid Boyz.

Legal Trouble 
In 2000, the label released a 7-inch by the Evolution Control Committee called "Rocked By Rape", a criticism and parody of violence on television which used words spoken by Dan Rather and sampled music from AC/DC. CBS threatened legal action against Eerie Materials on the grounds of copyright infringement. This threat outraged members of the Evolution Control Committee as well as Negativland. Nevertheless, Eerie discontinued further sales of the record and no further legal action was taken.

Artists (partial list) 
Anachronauts
Breathilizor
Brown Cuts Neighbors
Caroliner
Cave Clown Microwave
Colon On The Cob
Dum Dum TV
ENE
Evolution Control Committee
Eeyore Gorilla Cookies
Faxed Head
Friendly
Gang of Pork
Hemorrhoy Rogers more info on Hemorrhoy here:  http://pingpongdingdong.com/
Kingdom Scum
Negativland
Nudibranch
Sludgecrypt
Sockeye
Sonique Rabbit Fists
Teenage Larvae
The Popsicle Melts

See also
 List of record labels
Cassette culture 1970s–1990s

External links 
 
Press release of CBS' litigation threat
Kingdom Scum bio on Lost Frog
Kingdom Scum on Discogs
Partial discography of Eerie Materials

American record labels
Experimental music record labels
Industrial record labels
Music of the San Francisco Bay Area